Míne Bean Uí Chribín (20 December 1927 - 6 August 2012) was a prominent Irish conservative campaigner.

Early life
Míne was born in Santry in 1927 as Christine Philomena Lawless. She had a love of music and learned to play the church organ, playing it at several churches, but according to her family her favourite church to play at was Saint Papain's at Ballymun Cross. She played the church organ at almost all of their religious services for 35 years.

Career
After she finished school, she worked at the Department of Posts and Telegraphs from 1944 to 1952. Her father was postmaster in Santry and she took a job as an assistant there in 1953. She succeeded him in the post after his death in 1963 and worked there until she was hospitalised in 2012.

Family
She married Gus Ó Chribín and they had six children. Her husband and one son predeceased her.

School
In 1994 she insisted that Scoil Paipín Naofa, a National school run on land owned by her, teach traditionalist Catholicism. The resulting row led to many parents removing their children from the school.

Writing
She wrote several books, including a novel based on how her parents met, a social history of Ballymun Cross and three books in Irish. Until she was hospitalised in 2012, she wrote for An Timire and wrote a children's column Eoghanín.

Campaigning
She was involved with two political organisations, Mná na hÉireann (Women of Ireland), founded in Cork in 1970, and the Irish Housewives Union, founded by Úna Mhic Mhathúna. Both organisations criticised women's liberation and the availability of contraception, as well as the legalisation of divorce and abortion. She was also alleged to have had some involvement with Cóir.

The IHU regularly interrupted meetings of the Anti-Amendment campaign in the run up to the referendum on abortion.

She appeared frequently on The Late Late Show, representing conservative Roman Catholics and serving as a "barometer" for conservative opinions. During an interview she compared divorce to adultery.

In an interview with The Irish Times in May 1985, regarding the proposed family planning legislation, Bean said that it was "classic of the rottenness of our society" and of divorce said "it is just a connived issue, concocted by a small group, but they have the media".

In an interview by Aodhán Madden in New Hiberniain in June 1985, when asked about relationships that had irrevocably broken down she said "We [the IHU] have never found an irrevocably broken down marriage, never." On homosexuality she said "It's just not natural to be a homosexual. You show me anywhere in the whole of nature where homosexuality is natural?" She also said it was "a by-product of contraception."

Alleged involvement in Roscommon Case
In 2009 allegations emerged that she had helped parents obtain a High Court injunction to prevent children being taken into care in an incest case in County Roscommon.

During the case, a Health Service Executive childcare manager said that Bean had contacted him to argue that the family needed support, not intrusion. He admitted that he had no evidence she was involved in the application, but suspected she was. She denied having any part in the application, saying she would not believe a "Hail Mary" from healthcare workers.

The mother in the case was jailed for offences including incest, sexual assault and neglect of her children.

In a statement to the Irish Independent, Bean denied providing any financial or legal assistance in the case and said that any help was "given in good faith". She said she was "shocked to learn of the revelations that have unfolded", accusing State officials of trying to scapegoat her to "deflect blame."

The HSE report into the case was released in 2010 and did not name anyone, though it did say a "Mrs B" contacted the Garda Síochána after the High Court injunction was granted in October 2000. It also stated that a "Mrs B" wrote to the Minister for Children, asking the minister to stop the Western Health Board from "persecuting" the family.

References

1927 births
2012 deaths
Irish anti-abortion activists
Irish women activists
People from Santry
Conservatism in Ireland